Fast & Furious Presents: Hobbs & Shaw (Original Motion Picture Soundtrack) is the soundtrack album to the 2019 Fast & Furious spin-off film Hobbs & Shaw. It was released on July 26, 2019, through Back Lot Music, a week before the film's theatrical release. The soundtrack contains several collaborations from different artists which are Yungblud, The Heavy, Logic, Aston Wyld (now Aston), Ohana Bam, Brothers Voodoo, Yonaka, Aloe Blacc, The Movement and Idris Elba who appears in the film.

"Next Level", a song originally composed for the film, was later covered by South Korean girl band Aespa and released around the time of F9's theatrical release in 2021.

Track listing

Charts

Film score

Fast & Furious Presents: Hobbs & Shaw (Original Motion Picture Score) was released on August 2, 2019, along with the film's theatrical release, and a week after the release of the Original Motion Picture Soundtrack. The score was composed by Tyler Bates and released by Back Lot Music.

All music composed by Tyler Bates.

References

External links

2019 soundtrack albums
2010s film soundtrack albums
Fast & Furious albums
Back Lot Music soundtracks
Tyler Bates soundtracks
Action film soundtracks
Thriller film soundtracks